Regina is an unincorporated community in Lancaster and Northumberland Counties  in the U. S. state of Virginia.

References

Unincorporated communities in Virginia
Unincorporated communities in Lancaster County, Virginia
Unincorporated communities in Northumberland County, Virginia